William Prescott (1726–1795) was an American colonel in the Revolutionary War.

William Prescott may also refer to:

 William Prescott Jr. (1762–1844), United States lawyer
 William Prescott (physician) (1788–1875), United States physician, politician, and naturalist
 William H. Prescott (1796–1859), American historian
 W. W. Prescott (William Warren Prescott, 1855–1944), Seventh-Day Adventist leader
 Sir William Prescott, 1st Baronet (1874–1945), British engineer and Conservative Party politician
 William Robert Stanley Prescott (1912–1962), Conservative Party politician in the United Kingdom
 William Prescott (Kansas politician) (born 1954), member of the Kansas House of Representatives
 Sir William Prescott, a steam engine, see Kempton Park Steam Engines